Fathi Ghanem (Arabic: فتحي غانم) (2 March 1924 – 24 February 1999) was an Egyptian writer. Ghanem was born in Cairo to a working-class family. Later, he worked as an editor for Al Gomhuria and chairman of the board of directors at the Dar Al Tahrir Foundation, the newspaper's publisher.

Works

Books
 The Man who Lost His Shadow (الرجل الذي فقد ظله, translated by Desmond Stewart)
 The Elephants (الأفيال)
 The Mountain (الجبل)

Films
 The Man who Lost His Shadow
 Minister in Plaster

See also
 List of Egyptian authors
 List of Egyptian writers

References

External links

1924 births
Egyptian writers
1999 deaths